Gilberto Oviedo la Portilla (9 February 1938 – 31 October 2017), better known as Papi Oviedo, was a Cuban tres player. Papi, the son of musician Isaac Oviedo, started playing the tres when he was about 15. A veteran of many bands, Papi was the tres player in Elio Revé's band for 13 years. He later toured with Buena Vista Social Club, exposing the son cubano genre to wider audiences.

Early life 
Papi Oviedo was born Gilberto Oviedo La Portilla in 1938, son of tres player Isaac Oviedo (1902–1992). Papi Oviedo began playing tres in 1952 and worked his way up through local bands to be the primary tres player for singer Orlando Contreras. Between 1957 and 1969, he was the featured tresero for Conjunto Tipico Habanero, Conjunto Chappottín and Estrellas de Chocolate. Between 1980 and 1995, he teamed up with Elio Revé in a re-formed version of charanga outfit Orquesta Revé. In 1995, Papi left Orquesta Revé to record his debut solo album, Encuentro entre soneros (1997, Tumi Music). In 2001, he released Bana Congo, a collaborative album with Congolese guitarist Papa Noel.

Discography
As a leader
1997: Encuentro entre soneros (Tumi)
2001: Bana Congo (Tumi) – with Papa Noel

With Jane Bunnett
2002: Cuban Odyssey (Blue Note)

With Rubén González
2000: Chanchullo (World Circuit)

With Isaac Oviedo
1992: Routes of Rhythm Vol. 3 (Rounder)

References

External links
 Papi Oviedo at allmusic.com
 Giro Radamés (2007). Diccionario enciclopédico de la música en Cuba. La Habana

1938 births
2017 deaths
Tres players
Buena Vista Social Club
Son cubano musicians
Cuban guitarists
Musicians from Havana